Lycee Amchit is a private school that provides kindergarten, primary, complementary and secondary teaching. The main campus is located in the town of Amsheet, Lebanon. It covers an area of 10,000 square metres.

History
The School was founded in 1977 during the Lebanese Civil War by a psychologist (Claire Gedeon) and a specialized educator (Georges Gedeon) who fled from the war in the capital Beirut and settled in Amsheet.

Organisation
Lycee Amchit educates students from the age of 3 years. The primary languages are Arabic and French. English is taught as a secondary language.

Although secular, the school offers courses in religious education. Computer courses are taught starting from the third year of the kindergarten cycle. Students with educational difficulties benefit from the assistance of a psychologist, a speech therapist and additional courses.

Extracurricular activities
The school participated in the 2008 Model United Nations. They gave a dance performance at the 12th Annual Science and Arts Fair, on 7 May 2010, held at Lebanese American University, Byblos.

References

External links
 

Byblos District
Private schools in Lebanon
Educational institutions established in 1977
1977 establishments in Lebanon